Herodotus was an ancient Greek historian.

Herodotus may also refer to:

Persons  
 Herodotus (physician), the name of three ancient physicians 
 Herodotos of Tralles (2nd century BC), victor of the Pythian Games at the boys' stadion
 Herodotos of Klazomenai, the first Clazomenian Olympic winner, his victory being in the boys foot-race. The Clazomenians dedicated a statue of him at Olympia, Greece

Objects
 Herodotus Machine, a machine described by Herodotus, used by the Egyptians to construct the pyramids

Places  
 Mons Herodotus, a mountain on the moon
 Herodotus (crater), a crater on the moon